Ross McKenzie (born 16 March 1983) is a New Zealand former footballer.

Singapore

One of Sengkang Punggol's foreign imports listed for the 2007 S.League, McKenzie was said to have made a positive impact on the squad, recovering from an injury to the knee that season as well.

Slotted two goals in a 2–2 tie with Tampines Rovers in the semi-finals of the 2007 Singapore League Cup.

Personal life

Even though he was born in Scotland, the midfielder is domiciled in New Zealand.

References

External links 
 at Soccerway

1983 births
Living people
Association football forwards
Association football midfielders
Auckland City FC players
Expatriate association footballers in New Zealand
Expatriate footballers in Singapore
Footballers from Dundee
Hougang United FC players
New Zealand association footballers
New Zealand expatriate association footballers
New Zealand people of Scottish descent
Scottish expatriate footballers
Scottish expatriate sportspeople in New Zealand
Scottish footballers
Singapore Premier League players
Team Wellington players
Waikato FC players
Waitakere United players
Akron Zips men's soccer players